The Porter Prize, established in 1984 by the non-profit organization known as the Porter Fund Literary Prize, is awarded annually to a writer who has created a substantial body of work and has a significant connection with Arkansas. The $5000 prize is one of the most prestigious literary awards in Arkansas. (The non-profit organization also awards a lifetime achievement award every five years and an annual scholarship to a student in the University of Central Arkansas Master of Fine Arts Creative Writing Program.) The Porter Prize was founded in honor of Ben Drew Kimpel.

Recipients
 2022	Mark Barr	Fiction
 2021	Jen Fawkes	Fiction
 2020	Geffrey Davis	Poetry
 2019	Qui Nguyen	Playwriting
 2018	Tyrone Jaeger	Fiction
 2017	Padma Viswanathan	Fiction
 2016	Sandy Longhorn 	Poetry
 2015	Davis McCombs 	Poetry
 2014	Mara Leveritt	Non-Fiction
 2013  Pat Carr	Fiction
 2012  Margaret Jones Bolsterli  Non-Fiction
 2011 Bill Harrison	Fiction
 2010 Bob Ford	Playwriting
 2009 Roy Reed	Non-Fiction
 2008 Trenton Lee Stewart	Fiction
 2007 Greg Brownderville	Poetry
 2006 Donald "Skip" Hays	Fiction
 2005 Shirley Abbott Non-Fiction
 2005 Constance Merritt	Poetry
 2004 Michael Burns	Poetry
 2003 Kevin Brockmeier	Fiction
 2002 Ralph Burns	Poetry
 2001 Morris Arnold	Non-Fiction
 2001 Fleda Brown	Poetry
 2000 Jo McDougall	Poetry
 1999 Grif Stockley	Fiction
 1998 Michael Heffernan	Poetry
 1997 Dennis Vannatta	Fiction
 1996 David Jauss	Fiction
 1995 Norman Lavers	Fiction
 1994 Werner Trieschmann	Playwriting
 1993 No Prize was awarded	
 1992 Andrea Hollander	Poetry
 1991 Crescent Dragonwagon	Fiction
 1990 James Twiggs	Fiction
 1989 Hope Norman Coulter	Fiction
 1988 Paul Lake	Poetry
 1987 Donald Harington	Fiction
 1986 Buddy Nordan	Fiction
 1985 Leon Stokesbury	Poetry

References

American literary awards
Awards established in 1984